Chinese bus fire may refer to:
Chengdu bus fire, 2009
Xiamen bus fire, 2013
Xinyang bus fire, 2011

zh:中国式巴士火灾